The U.S. Women's Amateur Public Links Championship, often referred to as the Public Links or the Publinx, was a women's amateur golf tournament, one of 10 individual amateur championships organized by the USGA and first played in 1977.  The USGA officially called the event the U.S. Women's Amateur Public Links, which it has registered as a service mark. The tournament was devised as a championship for female amateurs who play on public courses, as members of private clubs were barred from entry. In February 2013, the USGA announced that both this event and its men's counterpart, the U.S. Amateur Public Links, would be discontinued after their 2014 editions, and would be replaced by new amateur four-ball championships for both men and women.

While the U.S. Amateur Public Links was first held in 1922, the women's counterpart event was not held until 55 years later. Both the men's and women's Publinx had been created to provide outlets for national competition for public-course golfers, who before 1979 had been barred from entering either the U.S. Amateur or U.S. Women's Amateur because both events were restricted to members of clubs affiliated with the USGA or (presumably) other national governing bodies. When the USGA announced the demise of the men's and women's Publinx, it specifically stated that "the APL [Amateur Public Links] and WAPL [Women's Amateur Public Links] championships no longer serve their original mission because of the widespread accessibility public-course golfers today enjoy in USGA championships."
  
The main tournament opened with two rounds of stroke play. The leading 64 players then qualified to compete in a match play competition. The matches were played over 18 holes. Before 2002, the final was also played over 18 holes.  From 2002 to 2014, the final was played over 36 holes.

Eligibility is similar to that for the U.S. Women's Amateur. Golfers must follow the USGA's guidelines for amateur status. The USGA defines an "amateur golfer" as anyone who plays golf purely for the qualities of the game itself, "not as a profession and not for financial gain". The Public Links, like the U.S. Women's Amateur, had no age restrictions. However, there were two key differences in the eligibility criteria for the Public Links:
Entries were accepted from golfers with a USGA handicap index of 18.4 or lower, as opposed to 5.4 for the U.S. Women's Amateur.
Entries were not accepted from players who had playing privileges at golf clubs not open to the general public, and such golfers were not allowed to compete if they received such privileges between their entry and the end of the main tournament.
Exceptions to above: The USGA did consider some players with privileges at non-public facilities to be "bona fide public course players," specifically those whose privileges were solely due to any of the following:
Their enrollment in a specific educational institution.
Their status as active or retired members of the military.
Their current or former employment by an entity other than a golf club.

Michelle Wie became the youngest champion in the history of USGA adult championships when she won the 2003 U.S. Women's Public Links championship at age 13, her final tournament victory as an amateur. Wie also holds the record as the youngest Publinx competitor; she played in 2000 as a 10-year-old.

Winners

Multiple winners
2 wins: Kelly Fuiks, Lori Castillo, Pearl Sinn, Jo Jo Robertson, Tiffany Joh

Four players have won both the U.S. Women's Amateur Public Links and U.S. Women's Amateur Championships:
 Pearl Sinn: Publinx – 1988, 1989; Amateur – 1988
 Amy Fruhwirth: Publinx – 1992; Amateur – 1991
 Jill McGill: Publinx – 1994; Amateur – 1993
 Jennifer Song: Publinx – 2009; Amateur – 2009

References

External links
Official site

Amateur golf tournaments in the United States
Public Links
Women's Amateur Public Links